The River School is an independent Christian School, affiliated with the Christian Schools Trust.

The school has about 140 full-time day pupils, aged from 2 to 16, who are drawn from the city of Worcester, and surrounding  towns  The school is non-denominational.

A report in February 2013, by the Bridge Schools Inspectorate,  rated the overall quality of teaching as good, with outstanding elements.

History 
The school was founded in the autumn of 1985,  by parents who felt that the secular education found in the local schools did not fit with their beliefs. The school had been planned for several years by the parents, many of whom were members of churches in and around Worcester. Oakfield House, where the school is sited, was purchased by the Worcester Christian Education Trust, which oversees the running of the school to this day.

Oakfield House was constructed in the early 19th century, as a private house, and has since been used as: military billets, a residential girls' school and an Agricultural Training College under the control of Worcester LEA.  In 1987, the Trust purchased another building close to central Worcester for use as the Brook Nursery School, for pupils aged 2–7.

The school continued to expand, aided by a low-fee philosophy and generous discounts for less well-off students. However, the River School, like many a small enterprise, has suffered setbacks over the years due to a lack of funds. For this reason, it was decided in 2006 to sell off the Brook School, and use the money to service the trust's debt and improve the school's resources base. Since then, the nursery has been reopened as part of The River School, which has since been greatly expanded.

References 

Educational institutions established in 1985
Private schools in Worcestershire
Schools in Worcester, England
1985 establishments in England